Coleophora nutantella is a moth of the family Coleophoridae. It is found from Fennoscandia to Spain, Sicily and Greece and from France to the Baltic states, Poland, Slovakia, Hungary and Romania. It is also found in Asia Minor.

The wingspan is 14–18 mm. Adults are on wing from May to July.

The larvae feed on Silene nutans, Silene otites and Oberna behen. They feed on the generative organs of their host plant.

References

External links
 Coleophora nutantella at UKmoths

nutantella
Moths described in 1857
Moths of Europe
Moths of Asia
Taxa named by Heinrich Frey